Mantė Kvederavičiūtė (born 28 November 1990) is a Lithuanian basketball player and she played at shooting guard position. She competed for Lithuania in all major European tournaments since 2011.

References

External links
Profile at eurobasket.com

1990 births
Living people
People from Prienai
Lithuanian women's basketball players
Shooting guards